The Dover Lane Music Conference is an annual Indian classical music festival held in the month of January at Nazrul Mancha, an outdoor auditorium in south Kolkata. 
The Dover Lane Music Conference is an all night concert attended by visitors from all over the world. It typically showcases vocal recital, sitar, sarod, and violin music.

History
The festival derives its name from the fact that it originally took place at a location on Dover Lane courtesy the patronage of Late Sri Narendra Singh Singhi at his residence, Singhi Park.

See also

List of Indian classical music festivals
 Swara Samrat festival

References

External links
 

Culture of Kolkata
Hindustani classical music festivals
Recurring events established in 1952
Music festivals established in 1952
Events in Kolkata